Eternamente (English Endlessly) is the 16th studio album by Mexican pop singer Ana Gabriel. It was released in 2000. This material shows a nostalgic Ana Gabriel where she pays tribute to the Bolero's fathers Los Panchos and Los Diamantes. It was recorded at Sony Studios, Mexico.

Track listing
Tracks:
 Poquita Fe 03:06
 Como Un Lunar 02:53
 Dios No Lo Quiera 03:24
 No Lloraré 02:48
 Caminos Diferentes 02:58
 Por Ti 04:21
 Flores Negras 03:29
 Tú Me Acostumbraste 02:46
 Historia de un Amor 03:08
 Franqueza 03:21
 Más Que Un Simple Amor (Te Quieres Engañar) 03:37
 Eternamente 02:55

Album charts

 Note: This release reached the #11 position in Billboard Latin Pop Albums staying for 5 weeks  and it reached the #23 position in the Billboard Top Latin Albums staying for 13 weeks in the chart.

Sales and certifications

References

2000 albums
Ana Gabriel albums